The men's 81 kg judo competition at the 2016 Summer Paralympics was held on 9 September at Carioca Arena 3.

Results

Repechage

References

External links
 

M81
Judo at the Summer Paralympics Men's Half Middleweight